WBRK-FM (101.7 MHz, "Star 101.7") is a commercial FM radio station in Pittsfield, Massachusetts.  It is owned by WBRK, Inc. and broadcasts a hot adult contemporary radio format.

History
The station signed on the air as WBRK-FM on October 10, 1970. On October 26, 1981 the station changed its call sign to WKTQ.  On July 30, 1984 the station became WRCZ. The WBRK-FM call sign returned on August 2, 1996.

References

External links

BRK-FM
Hot adult contemporary radio stations in the United States
Pittsfield, Massachusetts
Mass media in Berkshire County, Massachusetts
Radio stations established in 1970
1970 establishments in Massachusetts